The 2000 United States presidential election in Minnesota took place on November 7, 2000, as part of the 2000 United States presidential election, which was held throughout all 50 states and D.C. Voters chose ten representatives, or electors to the Electoral College, who voted for president and vice president.

Minnesota was won by Vice President Al Gore by a 2.4% margin of victory, a much weaker performance than President Bill Clinton had in 1996, when he carried the state with 51% of the vote and a 16% margin of victory. This was also the closest result since 1984 when it became the only state won by Walter Mondale. Despite winning the state, Gore lost most of the counties and congressional districts in the state. However, Gore won highly populated counties such as Hennepin County, Ramsey County, and St. Louis County by safe margins. In terms of congressional districts, Gore won three districts including the urban 4th and 5th and won the 8th district with less than fifty percent of the vote. Bush overall dominated the rural areas, located in the western and southern parts of the state, and became the first Republican presidential nominee to win Red Lake County since Warren G. Harding in 1920.  No Republican has won the state since Richard Nixon in 1972, a Democratic streak longer than any other state. This is the last time Minnesota voted to the left of Oregon.

Despite Nader taking away a good deal of Gore voters, he was still able to win the state by a fairly close margin. Gore's win was partially due to his huge numbers out of Minneapolis, and St. Paul. Gore's win was able to keep Minnesota in Democrats hands once again. , this is the last election in which Cook County voted for a Republican presidential candidate.

Results

Results by county

Counties that flipped from Democratic to Republican
Anoka (Largest city: Blaine)
Becker (Largest city: Detroit Lakes)
Beltrami (Largest city: Bemidji)
Benton (Largest city: Sauk Rapids)
Blue Earth (Largest city: Mankato)
Cass (Largest city: Lake Shore)
Chippewa (Largest city: Montevideo)
Chisago (Largest city: North Branch)
Clay (Largest city: Moorhead)
Clearwater (Largest city: Bagley)
Cook (Largest city: Grand Marais)
Cottonwood (Largest city: Windom)
Crow Wing (Largest city: Brainerd)
Dakota (Largest city: Hastings)
Dodge (Largest city: Kasson)
Faribault (Largest city: Blue Earth)
Goodhue (Largest city: Red Wing)
Grant (Largest city: Elbow Lake)
Houston (Largest city: La Crescent)
Hubbard (Largest city: Park Rapids)
Isanti (Largest city: Cambridge)
Jackson (Largest city: Jackson)
Kanabec (Largest city: Mora)
Kandiyohi (Largest city: Willmar)
Kittson (Largest city: Hallock)
Koochiching (Largest city: International Falls)
Lake of the Woods (Largest city: Baudette)
Le Sueur (Largest city: Le Sueur)
Lyon (Largest city: Marshall)
Mahnomen (Largest city: Mahnomen)
Marshall (Largest city: Warren)
Martin (Largest city: Fairmont)
McLeod (Largest city: Hutchinson)
Meeker (Largest city: Litchfield)
Mille Lacs (Largest city: Princeton)
Morrison (Largest city: Little Falls)
Murray (Largest city: Slayton)
Nicollet (Largest city: North Mankato)
Nobles (Largest city: Worthington)
Norman (Largest city: Ada)
Pennington (Largest city: Thief River Falls)
Polk (Largest city: East Grand Forks)
Pope (Largest city: Glenwood)
Red Lake (Largest city: Red Lake Falls)
Renville (Largest city: Olivia)
Scott (Largest city: Shakopee)
Sherburne (Largest city: Elk River)
Sibley (Largest city: Gaylord)
Stearns (Largest city: St. Cloud)
Steele (Largest city: Owatonna)
Stevens (Largest city: Morris)
Todd (Largest city: Long Prairie)
Traverse (Largest city: Wheaton)
Wabasha (Largest city: Lake City)
Waseca (Largest city: Waseca)
Washington (Largest city: Stillwater)
Watonwan (Largest city: St. James)
Wright (Largest city: Otsego)
Yellow Medicine (Largest city: Granite Falls)

By congressional district
Bush won 5 of 8 congressional districts, including two held by Democrats.

Electors

Technically the voters of Minnesota cast their ballots for electors: representatives to the Electoral College. Minnesota is allocated ten electors because it has eight congressional districts and two senators. All candidates who appear on the ballot or qualify to receive write-in votes must submit a list of 10 electors, who pledge to vote for their candidate and his or her running mate. Whoever wins the majority of votes in the state is awarded all 10 electoral votes. Their chosen electors then vote for president and vice president. Although electors are pledged to their candidate and running mate, they are not obligated to vote for them. An elector who votes for someone other than his or her candidate is known as a faithless elector.

The electors of each state and the District of Columbia met on December 18, 2000 to cast their votes for president and vice president. The Electoral College itself never meets as one body. Instead the electors from each state and the District of Columbia met in their respective capitols.

The following were the members of the Electoral College from the state. All were pledged to and voted for Gore and Lieberman:
Carol Bartels
Prudy Cameron
Joan Campbell
Elmer Deutschmann
Elizabeth Kalisch
Matthew Little
Glenda Meixell
John Meuers
Janis Ray
Georgiana Ruzich

See also
 United States presidential elections in Minnesota

References

2000
Minnesota